Hello Premistara is a 2007 Indian Telugu-language romantic action film directed by Raj Kumar and produced by Puri Jagannadh. The film stars Sairam Shankar in a dual role alongside Sheela Kaur. The film has music composed by Chakri. The plot follows a triangle love drama between two step-brothers and a woman, inspired by the 1999 film Vaalee (1999).

Plot

Cast

Reception
G P Aditya Vardhan of Rediff.com wrote that "Though the plot is good, the director fails to make it an intense viewing". Jeevi of Idlebrain.com opined that "This kind of story line works well for Tamil films featuring competent actors, but it may not work out in Telugu". Sify said "Hello Premistara has nothing new to offer and turns out to be a forgettable experience". Full Hyderabad criticised the film.

References

External links
 

2007 films
2000s romantic action films
Indian romantic action films
2000s Telugu-language films
Films about lookalikes
Films scored by Chakri
Films about brothers